Francisco Alves dos Santos (born February 10, 1979 in Marabá), or simply Chicão, is a Brazilian defensive midfielder. He currently plays for Santa Cruz.

Honours

Club
 Fortaleza
Ceará State League: 2004
 Remo
Campeonato Brasileiro Série C: 2005
 Vitória
Bahia State League: 2007
 Santa Cruz
Pernambuco State League: 2011

External links

 

1981 births
Living people
Brazilian footballers
Brazilian expatriate footballers
Association football forwards
Santa Cruz Futebol Clube players
Paraná Clube players
Botafogo Futebol Clube (SP) players
People from Marabá
Sportspeople from Pará